Buchen is a town in Neckar-Odenwald district, Baden-Württemberg, Germany.

Buchen may also refer to:

Büchen, a municipality in the district of Lauenburg, Schleswig-Holstein, Germany
Büchen (Amt), a collective municipality in the district of Lauenburg, Schleswig-Holstein, Germany
Gustave W. Buchen (1886–1951), American politician and attorney, Wisconsin State Senator 
Philip W. Buchen (1916–2001), American attorney and  White House Counsel during the Ford administration